This is a list of the heritage sites in KwaZulu-Natal as recognized by the South African Heritage Resource Agency. For performance reasons, the following district has been split off from this page:
 List of heritage sites in Pietermaritzburg

|}

References 

Tourist attractions in KwaZulu-Natal
KwaZulu-Natal
Heritage sites